Daroor woreda (also spelled , , and , Ge'ez ዳሮር) is one of the woredas (districts) of the Somali Region of Ethiopia. It was announced in 2010 by the President of the Somali Region. Part of the Jarar zone, Daroor is bordered on the south by Gunagadow, on the west by Aware, on the north by the Harshin woreda, on the northeast by Somaliland, and on the east by Misraq Gashamo.

History
In 2005 Daroor had 14,016 inhabitants, according to the Ethiopian Central Statistical Agency. In 1997 of 9,397 inhabitants 99,47% of these were Somali, and 50 residents were from other ethnic groups. In 1988 a refugee camp was set up for Somalis. The refugee camp housed predominantly members of the Yonis Abdirahman, a sub-sub clan of Ciidagale which is a sub-division of the Garhajis Isaaq and subclan of the Isaaq from nearby Somaliland.  The camp's population fell from around 32.000 on 12.000 in September 1994. After renewed fighting in November, the population rose to 49.000. At the end of 2001 / the beginning of 2002 the camp was closed after most refugees voluntarily went home.

The economy of the area was strongly affected when the Saudi Arabian 1998 import of cattle from northeast Africa stopped.

References

Somali Region